Doc McStuffins is an American animated children's television series produced by Brown Bag Films. It was created and executive produced by Chris Nee and premiered on March 23, 2012 on Disney Channel and Disney Junior. The series is about a girl who can "fix" toys, with help from her toy friends. It features songs written and composed by Kay Hanley and Michelle Lewis.

On April 14, 2015, the series was renewed for a fourth season by Disney Junior, which premiered on July 29, 2016.

On November 16, 2016, Doc McStuffins was renewed for a fifth and final season by Disney Junior, which premiered on October 26, 2018.

The series finale aired on April 18, 2020.

Series overview

Episodes

Season 1 (2012–13)
Doc, Lambie, and Stuffy were present in all episodes in this season.
Chilly was absent from 11 episodes: "Knight Time", "Run Down Race Car", "Tea Party Tantrum", "Blast Off", "Arcade Escapade", "Stuck Up", "All Washed Up", "Wrap It Up", "Get Set to Get Wet", "To Squeak, or Not to Squeak", and "Brontosaurus Breath".
Hallie was absent from 4 episodes: "Arcade Escapade", "Stuck Up", "Get Set to Get Wet", and "To Squeak, or Not to Squeak".

Season 2 (2013–15)
Doc, Lambie, and Stuffy were present in all episodes in this season.
Chilly was absent from 1 episode: "Don't Knock the Noggin".
Hallie was absent from 2 episodes: "Don't Knock the Noggin" and "The Doctor Will See You Now".
Doc starts a mobile clinic 
Doc starts a vet clinic at the end of the season

Season 3 (2015–16)
Doc, Lambie, Stuffy, and Hallie were present in all episodes in this season.
Chilly was absent from 1 episode: "Slip n' Slide".

Season 4: Toy Hospital (2016–18)
Doc, Lambie, Stuffy, Hallie, and Chilly were present in all episodes in this season.
Note: This is the last season to feature two 11-minute stories.

Season 5: Pet Rescue (2018–20)
Doc, Lambie, Stuffy, Hallie and Chilly were present in all episodes in this season.
Note: Like other Disney Junior shows from the time, the episode title cards have been discontinued, but they are still heard. Also, the series no longer features two 11-minute stories. This is also the show's final season.

Special (2022)

The Doc Files

The Doc Files is a spin-off series to Doc McStuffins. Doc takes an in-depth look at specific cases and diagnoses after the clinic doors close for the day. The series debuted in the US on Disney Junior and Disney Channel on July 22, 2013.

Each episode opens with Doc pulling a toy patient's chart and recalling how she solved the case. The flashback sequences are done in 2D animation, while the beginning and end are done in the same CGI as the main Doc McStuffins episodes.

Shorts

Doc Toy Hospital: Pet Rescue

Doc Toy Hospital: Baby

Doc Toy Hospital: Arctic Rescue

Doc Toy Hospital: Ultimate Safari

DJ Melodies
Doc to the Rescue May 18, 2015
Welcome to the Family June 15, 2015

References

External links
 
 

Lists of American children's animated television series episodes